() is a traditional German alcoholic drink for which a rum-soaked sugarloaf is set on fire and drips into mulled wine. It is often part of a Christmas or New Year's Eve tradition. The name translates literally as fire-tongs punch, “Bowle” meaning “punch” being borrowed from English.

The popularity of the drink was boosted in Germany by the 1944 comedy film . It is a traditional drink of some German fraternities, who also call it , as the red color is reminiscent of a cherry liqueur of that name which was manufactured by the distillery  (in Gdańsk).

Procedure 

 is prepared in a bowl, similar to a fondue set, which usually is suspended over a small burner. The bowl is filled with heated dry red wine spiced with cinnamon sticks, cloves, star anise and orange peel, similar to mulled wine. The sugar is soaked with rum and set alight, melting and caramelizing. The rum should have at least 54% alcohol by volume (ABV), such as the high-ABV Austrian rum Stroh 80, and be at room temperature in order to burn properly. More rum is poured with a ladle until all the sugar has melted and mixed with the wine. The resulting punch is served in mugs while the burner keeps the bowl warm.

See also
 Flaming drink

References

External links 

Flaming drinks
German cuisine
Mixed drinks
Articles containing video clips
Christmas in Germany